Located in south-central North Dakota, Kulm Wetland Management District was established in 1971. Located in the Prairie Pothole Region of North America, Kulm Wetland Management District provides breeding, nesting, and brood rearing areas for many species of waterfowl and other migratory birds. The District's headquarters is in Kulm, North Dakota.

In many parts of Kulm Wetland Management District, the abundance of wetlands attracts waterfowl breeding pair densities of over 100 pairs per square mile. Native prairie is still well represented in the area and is home to many species of upland nesting birds. The James River meanders through the eastern portion of the District. As it leads south to the Missouri River, the James River forms a major migration corridor for numerous migrating birds.

References
District website

External links

National Wildlife Refuges in North Dakota
Protected areas of Dickey County, North Dakota
Protected areas of LaMoure County, North Dakota
Protected areas of Logan County, North Dakota
Protected areas of McIntosh County, North Dakota